Timothy Nehemiah Castille (born May 29, 1984) is an American football coach and former fullback. He was signed by the Arizona Cardinals as an undrafted free agent in 2007. He played college football at Alabama.

Professional career

Arizona Cardinals
Castille was signed by the Arizona Cardinals as an undrafted free agent in 2007. He played in all 14 of the Cardinals games in 2008. He was released on September 4, 2009.

Kansas City Chiefs
Castille signed with the Kansas City Chiefs on November 17, 2009. He participated in 17 Chiefs games from 2009-2010 scoring one touchdown by reception in 2009. He was declared a free agent on July 25, 2011.

Coaching career
He spent 2012 as a graduate assistant football coach under Nick Saban at Alabama. In 2015, he joined Thompson High School as a running backs coach and strength and conditioning coordinator.

Personal life
Castille's father, Jeremiah, also played college football at Alabama before spending six seasons in the NFL with the Tampa Bay Buccaneers and Denver Broncos. Castille's brother, Simeon, was a cornerback in the NFL and United Football League between 2008 and 2014. Simeon also played college football at Alabama.

References

External links
Kansas City Chiefs bio

1984 births
Living people
Sportspeople from Birmingham, Alabama
Players of American football from Birmingham, Alabama
American football fullbacks
Alabama Crimson Tide football players
Alabama Crimson Tide football coaches
Arizona Cardinals players
Kansas City Chiefs players